The Congress of the State of Nuevo León is the legislative branch of the government of the Mexican state of Nuevo León. The congress is the governmental deliberative body of Nuevo León, which is equal to, and independent of, the executive (the Governor of Nuevo León and his/her cabinet).

History
In July 1824 the first 11 deputies to congress were elected, creating the first Nuevo León Legislature on August 1, 1824.

In 1917 the number of deputies was increased to 15. Since then until the number of deputies has changed several times.

All deputies in the congress were elected by popular vote until 1979 when some seats in the congress were distributed by an apportionment process.

Since its installation the congress has been renewed 70 times.

See also
List of Mexican state congresses

External links
https://web.archive.org/web/20060528225025/http://www.congreso-nl.gob.mx/

Nuevo León
Government of Nuevo León
Nuevo León